Isaac William Stuart (1809 – October 2, 1861) was an American author.

He was son of Rev Moses Stuart, of Andover, Connecticut and Abigail (Clark) Stuart, and was born in New Haven, Connecticut, while his father was pastor of the Centre Church in this place. He graduated from Yale College in 1828.  For a short time after graduating, he taught in the Hopkins Grammar School at Hartford, Connecticut, and was much engaged in the study of hieroglyphics and Asian literature. He published in 1830 a translation, with notes, of J.G.H. Greppo's Essay on the Hieroglyphic System of Champollion. (Boston, 1830, 12mo.) Being elected Professor of Greek and Latin in the College of South Carolina, he removed to Columbia, South Carolina and there remained some time. He published in 1837, an edition with notes of the Oedipus Tyrannus of Sophocles. (New York, 12mo )

At length he returned to Hartford, and was well known for many years as proprietor of the Wyllys Estate on which was standing the famous Charter Oak. He was distinguished for his enthusiastic attention to the history of his native state.  He published in 1856, a Life of Nathan Hale, the Martyr Spy of the Revolution, (Hartfoid, 1856, 8vo.) a volume of local historical sketches, entitled Hartford in the Olden Time, by "Scaeva", (Hartford, 1853, 8vo.) and an elaborate Life of Governor Jonathan Trumbull. (Boston, 1857, 8vo. pp 700.)

He married Caroline Bulkely.  He died in Hartford, October 2, 1861, aged 52.

Writers from New Haven, Connecticut
Yale College alumni
University of South Carolina faculty
19th-century American writers
19th-century American translators
1809 births
1861 deaths